Ij (also Romanized as Īj) is a city in the Central District of Estahban County, Fars Province, Iran.  At the 2006 census, its population was 6,233, in 1,497 families.

References 

Populated places in Estahban County
Cities in Fars Province